is a Japanese former singer, television presenter, and bassist for the Johnny & Associates group Tokio.

Career
He has acted in several movies and television shows as well as being a co-star for Tokio's variety shows Tokio Kakeru and The Tetsuwan Dash.

On 25 April 2018, news broke that Yamaguchi had been referred to prosecutors for allegedly kissing a girl against her will at his home in Minato, Tokyo, in February 2018. At a hastily arranged news conference at a hotel in Tokyo on 26 April, Yamaguchi apologized for kissing and engaging in indecent behavior with a high school-aged girl. A lawyer representing Johnny & Associates, the talent agency that manages Tokio, announced that Yamaguchi would be indefinitely suspended from activities.

On 6 May 2018, Johnny & Associates announced that they had terminated their contract with Yamaguchi.

Personal life

Yamaguchi married a former model in March 2008. On 5 August 2016, he announced that they had divorced.

On September 22, 2020, he was arrested on suspicion of drunk driving after rear ending a car in front of his motorcycle.

Filmography
Film
 That's Cunning! Shijō Saidai no Sakusen? (1996), as Kimura Kenji
 Kung Fu Panda (2008), as Po (Japanese version)
 Kung Fu Panda: Secrets of the Furious Five (2008), as Po (voice)
 Kung Fu Panda 2 (2011), as Po (Japanese version)

Television
 Wataru Seken wa Oni Bakari (1993), guest appearance
 Ten (2003), presenter
 Būke o Nerae! (2002–2003), presenter
 Ue o Muite Arukō: Sakamoto Kyu Monogatari (2005), as Kyu Sakamoto
 Onee Mans (2006–2009), presenter
 Majo-tachi no 22-ji (2009–2011), presenter
 R no Hōsoku (2011–2018), presenter
 Zip! (2011–2018), Monday, Wednesday main personality
 Shiawase! Bonbi Girl (2011–2018), presenter

References

1972 births
Living people
Japanese bass guitarists
Tokio (band) members
Musicians from Saitama Prefecture
People from Sōka
21st-century bass guitarists